Dennis Haueisen (born 13 September 1978 in Gera) is a retired German professional road bicycle racer who was active between 2001 and 2008. He is a son of Lutz Haueisen, amateur cyclist who won two world titles in track events.

Palmares 

 Profronde van Fryslan (2004)
 International Cycling Classic – 1 stage & Overall (2006)

References

External links 

1978 births
Living people
German male cyclists
Sportspeople from Gera
Cyclists from Thuringia
21st-century German people